American Excelsior Company is headquartered in Arlington, Texas and was established in the year 1888.  American Excelsior Company is a manufacturer and distributor of packed, cushioned and engineered products for flexible foams, erosion control, and wood fibers.

History
 The company was formed when H.W. Selle Company and Excelsior Wrapper Company was merged. In 1929, Excelsior Wrapper Company, H.W. Selle Company and their associated companies were consolidated under one company, and one name: American Excelsior Corporation. The company started a producer of wood excelsior (Wood wool).

Research participation
American Excelsior participated on a feasibility study, entitled "Feasibility Study of an Erosion Control Laboratory in New England".  The company was mentioned by Virginia Department of Forestry on its document entitled "Potential Value-added Products from Wildfire Fuel Mitigation Projects in Eastern Virginia", stating that company can help on erosion control through its products and services.

References

Manufacturing companies based in Texas
Distribution companies of the United States